The Year's Best Science Fiction: Second Annual Collection is a science fiction anthology edited by Gardner Dozois that was published in 1985.  It is the 2nd in The Year's Best Science Fiction series.

Contents

"Salvador" by Lucius Shepard 
"Promises to Keep" by Jack McDevitt 
"Bloodchild" by Octavia E. Butler 
"Blued Moon" by Connie Willis 
"A Message to the King of Brobdingnag" by Richard Cowper 
"The Affair" by Robert Silverberg 
"PRESS ENTER []" by John Varley  
"New Rose Hotel" by William Gibson  
"The Map" by Gene Wolfe 
"Interlocking Pieces" by Molly Gloss 
"Trojan Horse" by Michael Swanwick  
"Bad Medicine" by Jack Dann 
"At the Embassy Club" by Elizabeth A. Lynn 
"Pursuit of Excellence" by Rena Yount  
"The Kindly Isle" by Frederik Pohl  
"Rock On" by Pat Cadigan 
"Sunken Gardens [Mechanist-Shapers]" by Bruce Sterling 
"Trinity" by Nancy Kress 
"The Trouble with the Cotton People" by Ursula K. Le Guin 
"Twilight Time" by Lewis Shiner 
"Black Coral" by Lucius Shepard 
"Friend" by James Patrick Kelly & John Kessel 
"Foreign Skins" by Tanith Lee 
"Company in the Wings" by R. A. Lafferty 
"A Cabin on the Coast" by Gene Wolfe 
"The Lucky Strike" by Kim Stanley Robinson

External links
Story synopses by Brian Davies

1985 anthologies
02
St. Martin's Press books